The 2016 Missouri elections took place on November 8, 2016. Republicans swept all statewide offices up for election, expanding their footprint in the state. The only two remaining Democratic statewide officeholders after this cycle were U.S. Senator Claire McCaskill and State Auditor Nicole Galloway.

Presidential 

Republican candidate Donald Trump carried the state by a wide margin. Democrat Hillary Clinton received 37.87% of the vote to Trump's 56.38%. Clinton's performance in the state was the worst for a Democratic presidential nominee since George McGovern in 1972.

United States Senate 

Incumbent Roy Blunt faced Missouri Secretary of State Jason Kander in the general election. Blunt's performance underperformed Donald Trump's by nearly 15 points, but he won nonetheless.

United States House of Representatives

Governor

Lieutenant Governor

Secretary of State

State Treasurer

Attorney General

References

 
Missouri